The fifth season of the American television drama series Empire premiered on September 26, 2018 and ended on May 8, 2019, in the United States on Fox. The season was ordered on May 2, 2018, consisting of eighteen episodes with Brett Mahoney taking over as showrunner from Ilene Chaiken. The show is produced by 20th Century Fox Television, in association with Imagine Entertainment, Lee Daniels Entertainment, Danny Strong Productions and Little Chicken Inc. The showrunners for this season are Mahoney, Danny Strong and Lee Daniels.

Cast and characters

Main cast
 Terrence Howard as Lucious Lyon
 Taraji P. Henson as Cookie Lyon
 Bryshere Y. Gray as Hakeem Lyon
 Jussie Smollett as Jamal Lyon
 Trai Byers as Andre Lyon
 Gabourey Sidibe as Becky Williams
 Ta'Rhonda Jones as Porsha Taylor
 Serayah as Tiana Brown 
 Nicole Ari Parker as Giselle Sims
 Andre Royo as Thirsty Rawlings
 Chet Hanks as Blake
 Rhyon Nicole Brown as Maya
 A.Z. Kelsey as Jeff Kingsley

Recurring cast
 Forest Whitaker as Eddie Barker
 Toby Onwumere as Kai Givens
 Katlynn Simone as Treasure
 Mario as Devon
 Skylan Brooks as Quincy 
 Tasha Smith as Carol Holloway
 Phylicia Rashad as Diana DuBois  
 Meta Golding as Teri 
 Wood Harris as Damon Cross 
 Vivica A. Fox as Candace Holloway 
 Joss Stone as Wynter
 Tisha Campbell-Martin as Brooke
 Alicia Coppola as Megan Conway
 Xzibit as Shine

Episodes

Production

Development
As part of the renewal process, Brett Mahoney took over as showrunner from Ilene Chaiken.

Casting
On July 18, 2018, Deadline Hollywood reported that Rhyon Nicole Brown has been upped to regular cast. On June 25, 2018, Nicole Ari Parker was also upgraded to series regular status after recurring in the fourth season.

On February 22, 2019, series executives announced that Jussie Smollett would not appear in the final two episodes of the season. Smollett had been arrested in Chicago one day earlier, on charges of disorderly conduct and filing a false police report in connection with an assault on him that authorities believed he had staged.

Reception

Ratings

References

External links
 

Empire (2015 TV series) seasons
2018 American television seasons
2019 American television seasons